IRS-1C was the fifth remote sensing Indian satellite built, and designed by Indian Space Research Organization (ISRO). IRS-1C is first second-generation operational Remote Sensing Satellite. The satellite carries payloads with enhanced capabilities like better spatial resolution additional spectral bands, improved repeatability and augment the remote sensing capability of the existing IRS-1A and IRS-1B.

Objective 
The primary objective of IRS-1C was to provide systematic and repetitive acquisition of data of the Earth's surface under nearly constant illumination conditions.

Satellite 
IRS-1C was the fifth of the Indian natural resource imaging satellites and was launched by a Molniya-M launch vehicle from the Baikonur Cosmodrome. The  satellite carried three instruments. Images from regions other than India will be downlinked and distributed through a commercial entity in the United States. IRS-1C used S-band for broadcasting and X-band for uplinking of data. The satellite was equipped with onboard tape recorder with storage capacity of 62 Gigabits.

Instruments 
IRS-1C was equipped with three instruments:
 Linear Imaging Self-Scanning Sensor-3 (LISS-3) of  resolution in (VIS / NIR,  resolution in short-wave infrared (SWIR), for high-resolution land and vegetation observation
 Panchromatic Camera (PAN) of  resolution, for very-high-resolution land imagery
 Wide-Field Sensor (WiFS) of  resolution, for land and vegetation observation

Mission 
The images was marketed through a private company in the United States. The data transmitted from the satellite was gathered from National Remote Sensing Centre, Hyderabad and EOSAT, a partnership of Hughes Aircraft and RCA.

IRS-1C completed its services on 21 September 2005 after serving for 10 years.

See also 

 Indian Remote Sensing

References

External links 
 ISRO IRS-1C link

Earth observation satellites of India
Spacecraft launched in 1995
1995 in India